TMTFA is an extremely potent acetylcholinesterase inhibitor. As a transition state analog of acetylcholinesterase, TMTFA is able to inhibit acetylcholinesterase at extremely low concentrations (within the femtomolar range), making it one of the most potent acetylcholinesterase inhibitors known.

Mechanism of action
TMTFA has a reactive ketone group that can covalently bind to the serine residue in the active site of acetylcholinesterase. This is due to the electron-withdrawing trifluoromethyl group on the carbonyl group.

See also
Acetylcholinesterase inhibitor
Methylfluorophosphonylcholine
Transition state analog

References

Acetylcholinesterase inhibitors
Quaternary ammonium compounds
Aromatic ketones
Trifluoromethyl ketones
Acetophenones